Terry Linnard Dozier (born June 29, 1966) is an American former professional basketball player and coach. He played high school basketball at Dunbar High in Baltimore and later attended the University of South Carolina, where he played from 1985 to 1989. After his collegiate playing career concluded, Dozier went undrafted in the 1989 NBA draft but signed with the Charlotte Hornets of the National Basketball Association (NBA) for the 1989–90 season. He played nine games with the team, in which he averaged 2.4 points and 1.7 rebounds, before he was waived on November 27, 1989.

As he wasn't able to secure a spot on an NBA roster the following year, Dozier went on to play the remainder of his professional career internationally. Dozier played for the Geelong Supercats and Newcastle Falcons in Australia's National Basketball League (NBL). He was named the league's Best Defensive Player for three consecutive years from 1991 to 1993. Dozier played in Israel during the 1994–95 season for Hapoel Galil Elyon.

After his professional playing career ended, he went on to become head basketball coach for Westwood High School in Blythewood, South Carolina. The team faced off against the Spring Valley Vikings in December 2012, who were led by Terry's twin brother Perry. In 2016, Dozier was relieved of his coaching duties at Westwood.

Personal life
Dozier was a cousin of fellow NBA player Reggie Lewis. Dozier's nephew, P. J. Dozier, is also an NBA player.

References

External links

1966 births
Living people
Akita Isuzu/Isuzu Motors Lynx/Giga Cats players
American expatriate basketball people in Australia
American expatriate basketball people in Cyprus
American expatriate basketball people in Israel
American expatriate basketball people in Italy
American expatriate basketball people in the United Kingdom
American men's basketball players
Basketball players from Baltimore
Charlotte Hornets players
Hapoel Galil Elyon players
McDonald's High School All-Americans
Parade High School All-Americans (boys' basketball)
Quad City Thunder players
Small forwards
South Carolina Gamecocks men's basketball players
Tri-City Chinook players
Undrafted National Basketball Association players